Grand Central is a rock/metal pub and music venue at 80 Oxford Street, near Oxford Road railway station and opposite The Principal Manchester hotel in Manchester, England. 
It is a four storey building (including cellar) which is typical of buildings that were originally houses in the late eighteenth and early nineteenth century. Wakefield Street on the southside leads to the railway station via a pedestrian stairway.

It was once used as a meeting place for customers on their way to Jilly's Rockworld (originally named Rafters nightclub) which was situated in St James's Buildings at 65a Oxford Street, but since Rockworld's closing in early 2010 there is no longer a widely recognised alternative venue in Manchester.

Every Thursday night the pub works in partnership with Rocksector Records to put live music on. There are usually three or four bands and the pub is strictly free entry.

Grand Central has also hosted the annual Battle For Bloodstock competition. The competition runs on Tuesday nights over a few months early on in the year, where 36 local bands compete over six heats, two semi-finals and a Grand Final. The winners win a slot at the Bloodstock Open Air Festival in Derby, a well-respected British metal festival.

It was refurbished in 2004 and has since been host to Carved Photography's exhibition featuring photos by Sabrina Ramdoyal of bands from Manchester's local rock/metal scene as well as more established bands from all over the world. The pub currently offers a pool table, jukebox and two fruit machines. There used to be a club open downstairs called Subway, however this closed before 2002.

History

The name "Grand Central" is relatively new and was adopted because of the nearness of Oxford Road railway station, alluding to New York's Grand Central Station. Until the renaming the pub was the Beef & Barley and included a separate steak bar, having been modernised in the late 1960s. The beer stocked at that time was Watney/Wilsons from Wilsons Newton Heath Brewery. Earlier still the pub was called the Oxford Bar.

The oldest records found featuring Grand Central suggest that it was originally eight separate residential properties. This is shown in an 1849 map of Oxford Street.

First-hand accounts recall 80 Oxford Street being known as 'The Oxford Wine Bar' in 1953, and later in 1960 as simply 'The Oxford'. In 1970 it became the 'Beef & Barley', a Steak House, and a year later in 1971 'A Schooner Inn' was added to the 'Beef and Barley' pub sign. Between 1977 and 1978 it was known as the 'Cork & Screw' and it became 'The Shady Lady' in the late 1970s.

The Beer Scare of 1900
Peter Bostock was among several licensees in this area of Manchester who were suspected of unknowingly selling adulterated beer in 1900. The poisoned beer resulted in outbreaks of peripheral neuritis caused by arsenic poisoning that was traced by the Royal Commission to the raw materials found in brewing sugars at a refiners in Liverpool called Bostock & Co. of Garston (not thought to be a relation of the licensee). The company used a process involving sulphuric acid (made from arsenical iron pyrites) to manufacture glucose. Upon these findings, the Royal Commission recommended that 'a legal maximum of not more than one-hundredth of a grain of arsenic per gallon of liquid per pound of solid food be enforced'. By this point the damage had been done and up to four grains of arsenic were being found per pound of brewing sugar. The beer scare of 1900 has been mentioned in various articles on medical science, such as the Journal of the American Medical Association, where it was stated that over 2,000 people received medical treatment for peripheral neuritis. It is widely believed that the scare affected 6,000 people and killed 70.

Ghosts
Most residents of 80 Oxford Street are buried in Manchester's Southern Cemetery. There have only been two deaths recorded at this address; Peter Bostock in 1904 and Hannah Bostock in 1893, and one listed birth; Mabel Lewis in 1910. However, many customers and staff have reported apparent ghost sightings over the years at the pub.

Little Ireland

Grand Central exists on the periphery of what was once known as 'Little Ireland'. Containing mainly poorly skilled Irish immigrants it became Manchester's oldest, smallest and most short-lived Irish slum, where people lived in cramped, unhygienic conditions. In the 1820s the first immigrants moved there, and lived in the small streets off the main thoroughfare such as James Leigh Street which is located behind Grand Central. By the mid-1840s they were moved on and the area was demolished to make way for the industrious Victorian capitalists in their attempts to build the Manchester South Junction Railway line, which remains there to this day. In his book titled The Condition of the Working Class in England in 1844 social scientist Friedrich Engels wrote unfavourably about his experience of Little Ireland in Manchester in his book, claiming it was a 'horrid little slum'. Regardless of this, Little Ireland became world-famous, and the term itself became a generic shorthand for Irish living in slum housing throughout the 19th century industrial world.

Residents and staff

References

External links
 Grand Central Facebook page
 Grand Central Myspace
 Grand Central Twitter

Pubs in Manchester